The Mutshindudi River is a river in the Limpopo Province of South Africa, it originates from the Soutpansberg mountains. It is a right-hand tributary of the Levuvhu River. It's elevation is 534 metres above the sea level. It is about 50 km long and drops sleeply from a high rain fall region at 1200m to a lowland valley at 450m altitude where it joins the Luvuvhu river, it is a small yet permanent river, supplying the domestic demand of the Thohoyandou municipal area. Many 20m wide and 80m long riffles and rapids are found here.

Dams

Vondo Dam 
Vondo Dam was built in 1982 on the Mutshindudi river near Thohoyandou and Sibasa. It was built to supply water to the Tate - Vondo Tea Estate.

See also
 List of rivers in South Africa

References 

Rivers of Limpopo